Kyle Finch (born 6 December 1998 in Southampton) is an English professional squash player. As of February 2018, he was ranked number 149 in the world.

References

1998 births
Living people
English male squash players